Donja Budriga is a village in the municipality of Parteš in Kosovo. It is inhabited by a majority of ethnic Serbs.

Notes

References

Villages in Parteš
Serbian enclaves in Kosovo